Song Tao (born November 6, 1965 in Jimo, Shandong) is a retired Chinese basketball player and coach. 6'10" (209 cm) with impressive mobility, he was the first player from Asia drafted by an NBA team when the Atlanta Hawks selected him in the 3rd round of the 1987 NBA draft, although he never went to training camp due to serious knee injuries.

Song competed at 1988 Seoul Olympic Games and was the flag bearer of the Chinese Olympic team. He retired from China men's national basketball team in 1991 and became a player-coach in the Shandong provincial team. In 1993, Song went to study in San Francisco, California and then moved to Taiwan to compete in the professional Chinese Basketball Alliance until he retired there around the turn of the century. He coached the National Chiao Tung University varsity team in the ensuing years.

Song returned to China in 2003, and has since lived in Suzhou, Jiangsu where he became a businessman.

Family 
His wife Peng Ping is also a former basketball player. She was a member of the China women's national basketball team that won the 1992 Olympic silver medals in basketball in Barcelona, Spain.

References 

1965 births
Living people
Atlanta Hawks draft picks
Chinese men's basketball players
Basketball players from Qingdao
Asian Games medalists in basketball
Basketball players at the 1986 Asian Games
Power forwards (basketball)
Asian Games gold medalists for China
Medalists at the 1986 Asian Games
Chinese expatriate basketball people in Taiwan
Yulon Luxgen Dinos players
Chinese Basketball Alliance imports
BCC Mars players
LUCKIPar players